Swapnil Dhopade (born 5 October 1990) is an Indian chess grandmaster. In 2016, he became the first grandmaster from the Vidarbha region and the fifth from Maharashtra. In 2017, he shared 3rd place with a score of 6.5/9 at the Isle of Man International Masters tournament. In 2019, he was the coach for the Indian women's team at the World Team Chess Championship. His peak classical rating is 2545.

References 

Living people
1990 births
Indian chess players
Chess grandmasters
People from Nagpur